Qiantang is a town in Potou District, Zhanjiang, Guangdong, China.

References

Township-level divisions of Guangdong
Zhanjiang